The 2013 Arkansas State Red Wolves football team represented Arkansas State University in the 2013 NCAA Division I FBS football season. For the third consecutive season, the Red Wolves were led by a first-year head coach, with Bryan Harsin, previously offensive coordinator at Texas, taking over from Gus Malzahn, who left to become head coach at Auburn.

Shortly after the end of the regular season, Harsin would himself leave Arkansas State, moving to Boise State, his alma mater and a program where he had served as an assistant from 2001 to 2010, after Chris Petersen left for Washington. Harsin did not coach Arkansas State in the GoDaddy Bowl; Arkansas State named defensive coordinator John Thompson as interim head coach for the bowl game.

The Red Wolves, members of the Sun Belt Conference, played their home games at Liberty Bank Stadium (renamed after the 2013 season to Centennial Bank Stadium) in Jonesboro, Arkansas.

Schedule

References

Arkansas State
Arkansas State Red Wolves football seasons
Sun Belt Conference football champion seasons
LendingTree Bowl champion seasons
Arkansas State Red Wolves football